Ust-Zigan (Yegäntamaq) is a rural locality (a village) in Kuganaksky Selsoviet, Sterlitamaksky District, Bashkortostan, Russia. The population was 19 as of 2010. There is 1 street.

Geography 
Ust-Zigan is located 34 km northeast of Sterlitamak (the district's administrative centre) by road. Pokrovka is the nearest rural locality.

References 

Rural localities in Sterlitamaksky District